The 1892 United States House of Representatives elections were held for the most part on November 8, 1892, with Oregon, Maine, and Vermont holding theirs early in either June or September. They coincided with the election of Grover Cleveland as president for the second, non-continuous, time, defeating incumbent Benjamin Harrison. Elections were held for 356 seats of the United States House of Representatives, representing 44 states, to serve in the 53rd United States Congress. They were the first elections after reapportionment following the 1890 United States Census, increasing the size of the House. Special elections were also held throughout the year.

In spite of the presidential results, Harrison's Republican Party gained back some of the seats that had been lost in 1890 to the Democratic Party, but was still deep in the minority. The Republican pickups were a result of a number of Republican-friendly Northern districts reverting to form after voting Democratic in the previous election cycle. The third party Populists, who had high support among farmers and laborers in the South and West, also gained three seats.

Election summaries
This was the first election after reapportionment following the 1890 Census. Twenty-four new seats were added, with 13 States gaining one seat each, two States gaining 2 seats each, and one state gaining 3 seats, and the remaining 28 states having no change. Several states did not redistrict following the apportionment of extra seats, and elected those new seats at-large.

The previous election of 1890 saw the election of eight Populists, but no other third party or independent members.

Early election dates
In 1892 three states, with 8 seats among them, held elections early:

June 6 Oregon
September 6 Vermont
September 12 Maine

Alabama 

One new seat was added in reapportionment. Democrats gained a seat in the new district.

|-
! 
| Richard Henry Clarke
|  | Democratic
| 1888
| Incumbent re-elected.
| nowrap | 

|-
! 
| Hilary A. Herbert
|  | Democratic
| 1876
|  | Incumbent retired.New member elected.Democratic hold.
| nowrap | 

|-
! 
| William C. Oates
|  | Democratic
| 1880
| Incumbent re-elected.
| nowrap | 

|-
! 
| colspan=3 | None (District created)
|  | New seat.New member elected.Democratic gain.
| nowrap | 

|-
! 
| James E. Cobb
|  | Democratic
| 1886
| Incumbent re-elected.
| nowrap | 

|-
! 
| John H. Bankhead
|  | Democratic
| 1886
| Incumbent re-elected.
| nowrap | 

|-
! 
| William H. Forney
|  | Democratic
| 1876
|  | Incumbent retired.New member elected.Democratic hold.
| nowrap | 

|-
! 
| Joseph Wheeler
|  | Democratic
| 1884
| Incumbent re-elected.
| nowrap | 

|-
! 
| Louis Washington Turpin
|  | Democratic
| 1890
| Incumbent re-elected.
| nowrap | 

|}

Arkansas 

One new seat was added in reapportionment. Democrats gained a seat in the new district.

|-
! 
| William H. Cate
|  | Democratic
| 1890
|  | Incumbent retired.New member elected.Democratic hold.
| nowrap | 

|-
! 
| Clifton R. Breckinridge
|  | Democratic
| 1882
| Incumbent re-elected.
| nowrap | 

|-
! 
| Thomas Chipman McRae
|  | Democratic
| 1885
| Incumbent re-elected.
| nowrap | 

|-
! 
| William L. Terry
|  | Democratic
| 1890
| Incumbent re-elected.
| nowrap | 

|-
! 
| Samuel W. Peel
|  | Democratic
| 1884
|  | Incumbent retired.New member elected.Democratic hold.
| nowrap | 

|-
! 
| colspan=3 | None (District created)
|  | New seat.New member elected.Democratic gain.
| nowrap | 

|}

California 

One new seat was added in reapportionment. Democrats gained one seat from the Republicans, and the Populists gained a seat in the new district.

|-
! 
| Thomas J. Geary
|  | Democratic
| 1890
| Incumbent re-elected.
| nowrap | 

|-
! 
| Anthony Caminetti
|  | Democratic
| 1890
| Incumbent re-elected.
| nowrap | 

|-
! 
| Joseph McKenna
|  | Republican
| 1884
|  | Incumbent resigned March 28, 1892.Republican hold.
| nowrap | 

|-
! 
| John T. Cutting
|  | Republican
| 1890
|  | Incumbent retired.New member elected.Democratic gain.
| nowrap | 

|-
! 
| Eugene F. Loud
|  | Republican
| 1890
| Incumbent re-elected.
| nowrap | 

|-
! 
| colspan=3 | None (District created)
|  | New seat.New member elected.People's gain.
| nowrap | 

|-
! 
| William W. Bowers
|  | Republican
| 1890
| Incumbent re-elected.
| nowrap | 

|}

Colorado 

One new seat was added in reapportionment. Populists had a net gain of two seats, one taken from the Republicans, the other being a seat in the new district.

|-
! 
| colspan=3 | None (District created)
|  | New seat.New member elected.People's gain.
| nowrap | 

|-
! 
| Hosea Townsend
|  | Republican
| 1888
|  | Incumbent lost renomination.New member elected.People's gain.
| nowrap | 

|}

Connecticut 

|-
! 
| Lewis Sperry
|  | Democratic
| 1890
| Incumbent re-elected.
| nowrap | 

|-
! 
| Washington F. Willcox
|  | Democratic
| 1888
|  | Incumbent retired.New member elected.Democratic hold.
| nowrap | 

|-
! 
| Charles Addison Russell
|  | Republican
| 1886
| Incumbent re-elected.
| nowrap | 

|-
! 
| Robert E. De Forest
|  | Democratic
| 1890
| Incumbent re-elected.
| nowrap | 

|}

Delaware 

|-
! 
| John W. Causey
|  | Democratic
| 1890
| Incumbent re-elected.
| nowrap | 

|}

Georgia 

|-
! 
| Rufus E. Lester
|  | Democratic
| 1888
| Incumbent re-elected.
| nowrap | 

|-
! 
| colspan=3 | None (District created)
|  | New seat.New member elected.Democratic gain.
| nowrap | 

|-
! 
| Charles Frederick Crisp
|  | Democratic
| 1882
| Incumbent re-elected.
| nowrap | 

|-
! 
| Charles L. Moses
|  | Democratic
| 1890
| Incumbent re-elected.
| nowrap | 

|-
! 
| Leonidas F. Livingston
|  | Democratic
| 1890
| Incumbent re-elected.
| nowrap | 

|-
! 
| James Henderson Blount
|  | Democratic
| 1872
|  | Incumbent retired.New member elected.Democratic hold.
| nowrap | 

|-
! 
| Robert W. Everett
|  | Democratic
| 1890
|  | Incumbent retired.New member elected.Democratic hold.
| nowrap | 

|-
! 
| Thomas G. Lawson
|  | Democratic
| 1890
| Incumbent re-elected.
| nowrap | 

|-
! 
| Thomas E. Winn
|  | Democratic
| 1890
|  | Incumbent retired.New member elected.Democratic hold.
| nowrap | 

|-
! 
| Thomas E. Watson
|  | Democratic
| 1890
|  | Incumbent lost re-election as the People's nominee.New member elected.Democratic hold.
| nowrap | 

|-
! 
| Henry Gray Turner
|  | Democratic
| 1880
| Incumbent re-elected.
| nowrap | 

|}

Idaho 

|-
! 
| Willis Sweet
|  | Republican
| 1890
| Incumbent re-elected.
| nowrap | 

|}

Illinois 

|-
! rowspan=2 | 
| colspan=3 | None (District created)
|  | New seat.New member elected.Democratic gain.
| rowspan=2 nowrap | 

|-
| colspan=3 | None (District created)
|  | New seat.New member elected.Democratic gain.

|-
! 
| Abner Taylor
|  | Republican
| 1888
|  | Incumbent retired.New member elected.Republican hold.
| nowrap | 

|-
! 
| Lawrence E. McGann
|  | Democratic
| 1890
| Incumbent re-elected.
| nowrap | 

|-
! 
| Allan C. Durborow Jr.
|  | Democratic
| 1890
| Incumbent re-elected.
| nowrap | 

|-
! 
| Walter C. Newberry
|  | Democratic
| 1890
|  | Incumbent retired.New member elected.Democratic hold.
| nowrap | 

|-
! 
| Albert J. Hopkins
|  | Republican
| 1885
| Incumbent re-elected.
| nowrap | 

|-
! 
| Robert R. Hitt
|  | Republican
| 1882
| Incumbent re-elected.
| nowrap | 

|-
! 
| Thomas J. Henderson
|  | Republican
| 1874
| Incumbent re-elected.
| nowrap | 

|-
! 
| Lewis Steward
|  | Democratic
| 1890
|  | Incumbent lost re-election.New member elected.Republican gain.
| nowrap | 

|-
! 
| Herman W. Snow
|  | Democratic
| 1890
|  | Incumbent lost re-election.New member elected.Republican gain.
| nowrap | 

|-
! 
| Philip S. Post
|  | Republican
| 1886
| Incumbent re-elected.
| nowrap | 

|-
! 
| Benjamin T. Cable
|  | Democratic
| 1890
|  | Incumbent retired.New member elected.Republican gain.
| nowrap | 

|-
! 
| Scott Wike
|  | Democratic
| 1888
|  | Incumbent lost renomination.New member elected.Democratic hold.
| nowrap | 

|-
! 
| William McKendree Springer
|  | Democratic
| 1874
| Incumbent re-elected.
| nowrap | 

|-
! 
| Owen Scott
|  | Democratic
| 1890
|  | Incumbent lost re-election.New member elected.Republican gain.
| nowrap | 

|-
! 
| Samuel T. Busey
|  | Democratic
| 1890
|  | Incumbent lost re-election.New member elected.Republican gain.
| nowrap | 

|-
! 
| George W. Fithian
|  | Democratic
| 1888
| Incumbent re-elected.
| nowrap | 

|-
! 
| Edward Lane
|  | Democratic
| 1886
| Incumbent re-elected.
| nowrap | 

|-
! 
| William St. John Forman
|  | Democratic
| 1888
| Incumbent re-elected.
| nowrap | 

|-
! 
| James R. Williams
|  | Democratic
| 1888
| Incumbent re-elected.
| nowrap | 

|-
! 
| George Washington Smith
|  | Republican
| 1888
| Incumbent re-elected.
| nowrap | 

|}

Indiana 

|-
! 
| William F. Parrett
|  | Democratic
| 1888
|  | Incumbent retired.New member elected.Democratic hold.
| nowrap | 

|-
! 
| John L. Bretz
|  | Democratic
| 1890
| Incumbent re-elected.
| nowrap | 

|-
! 
| Jason B. Brown
|  | Democratic
| 1888
| Incumbent re-elected.
| nowrap | 

|-
! 
| William S. Holman
|  | Democratic
| 1880
| Incumbent re-elected.
| nowrap | 

|-
! 
| George W. Cooper
|  | Democratic
| 1888
| Incumbent re-elected.
| nowrap | 

|-
! 
| Henry U. Johnson
|  | Republican
| 1890
| Incumbent re-elected.
| nowrap | 

|-
! 
| William D. Bynum
|  | Democratic
| 1884
| Incumbent re-elected.
| nowrap | 

|-
! 
| Elijah V. Brookshire
|  | Democratic
| 1888
| Incumbent re-elected.
| nowrap | 

|-
! 
| Daniel W. Waugh
|  | Republican
| 1890
| Incumbent re-elected.
| nowrap | 

|-
! 
| David Henry Patton
|  | Democratic
| 1890
|  | Incumbent retired.New member elected.Democratic hold.
| nowrap | 

|-
! 
| Augustus N. Martin
|  | Democratic
| 1888
| Incumbent re-elected.
| nowrap | 

|-
! 
| Charles A. O. McClellan
|  | Democratic
| 1888
|  | Incumbent retired.New member elected.Democratic hold.
| nowrap | 

|-
! 
| Benjamin F. Shively
|  | Democratic
| 1886
|  | Incumbent retired.New member elected.Democratic hold.
| nowrap | 

|}

Iowa 

|-
! 
| William F. Parrett
|  | Democratic
| 1888
|  | Incumbent retired.New member elected.Democratic hold.
| nowrap | 

|-
! 
| Walter I. Hayes
|  | Democratic
| 1886
| Incumbent re-elected.
| nowrap | 

|-
! 
| David B. Henderson
|  | Republican
| 1882
| Incumbent re-elected.
| nowrap | 

|-
! 
| Walter Halben Butler
|  | Democratic
| 1890
|  | Incumbent lost re-election.New member elected.Republican gain.
| nowrap | 

|-
! 
| John Taylor Hamilton
|  | Democratic
| 1890
|  | Incumbent lost re-election.New member elected.Republican gain.
| nowrap | 

|-
! 
| Frederick Edward White
|  | Democratic
| 1890
|  | Incumbent lost re-election.New member elected.Republican gain.
| nowrap | 

|-
! 
| John A. T. Hull
|  | Republican
| 1890
| Incumbent re-elected.
| nowrap | 

|-
! 
| James Patton Flick
|  | Republican
| 1888
|  | Incumbent retired.New member elected.Republican hold.
| nowrap | 

|-
! 
| Thomas Bowman
|  | Democratic
| 1890
|  | Incumbent retired.New member elected.Republican gain.
| nowrap | 

|-
! 
| Jonathan P. Dolliver
|  | Republican
| 1888
| Incumbent re-elected.
| nowrap | 

|-
! 
| George D. Perkins
|  | Republican
| 1890
| Incumbent re-elected.
| nowrap | 

|}

Kansas 

|-
! 
| colspan=3 | None (District created)
|  | New seat.New member elected.People's gain.
| nowrap | 

|-
! 
| Case Broderick
|  | Republican
| 1890
| Incumbent re-elected.
| nowrap | 

|-
! 
| Edward H. Funston
|  | Republican
| 1884
| Incumbent re-elected.
| nowrap | 

|-
! 
| Benjamin H. Clover
|  | People's
| 1890
|  | Incumbent retired.New member elected.People's hold.
| nowrap | 

|-
! 
| John G. Otis
|  | People's
| 1890
|  | Incumbent lost renomination.New member elected.Republican gain.
| nowrap | 

|-
! 
| Benjamin H. Clover
|  | People's
| 1890
| Incumbent re-elected.
| nowrap | 

|-
! 
| William Baker
|  | People's
| 1890
| Incumbent re-elected.
| nowrap | 

|-
! 
| Jerry Simpson
|  | People's
| 1890
| Incumbent re-elected.
| nowrap | 

|}

Kentucky 

|-
! 
| William Johnson Stone
|  | Democratic
| 1884
| Incumbent re-elected.
| nowrap | 

|-
! 
| William Thomas Ellis
|  | Democratic
| 1888
| Incumbent re-elected.
| nowrap | 

|-
! 
| Isaac Goodnight
|  | Democratic
| 1888
| Incumbent re-elected.
| nowrap | 

|-
! 
| Alexander B. Montgomery
|  | Democratic
| 1886
| Incumbent re-elected.
| nowrap | 

|-
! 
| Asher G. Caruth
|  | Democratic
| 1886
| Incumbent re-elected.
| nowrap | 

|-
! 
| William Worth Dickerson
|  | Democratic
| 1890
|  | Incumbent lost renomination.New member elected.Democratic hold.
| nowrap | 

|-
! 
| William C. P. Breckinridge
|  | Democratic
| 1884
| Incumbent re-elected.
| nowrap | 

|-
! 
| James B. McCreary
|  | Democratic
| 1884
| Incumbent re-elected.
| nowrap | 

|-
! 
| Thomas H. Paynter
|  | Democratic
| 1888
| Incumbent re-elected.
| nowrap | 

|-
! 
| Joseph M. Kendall
|  | Democratic
| 1892 
|  | Incumbent retired.New member elected.Democratic hold.
| nowrap | 

|-
! 
| John Henry Wilson
|  | Democratic
| 1888
|  | Incumbent lost renomination.New member elected.Republican hold.
| nowrap | 

|}

Louisiana 

One new seat was added in reapportionment. Democrats gained a seat in the new district.

|-
! 
| Adolph Meyer
|  | Democratic
| 1890
| Incumbent re-elected.
| nowrap | 

|-
! 
| Matthew D. Lagan
|  | Democratic
| 1890
|  | Incumbent retired.New member elected.Democratic hold.
| nowrap | 

|-
! 
| Andrew Price
|  | Democratic
| 1888
| Incumbent re-elected.
| nowrap | 

|-
! 
| Newton C. Blanchard
|  | Democratic
| 1880
| Incumbent re-elected.
| nowrap | 

|-
! 
| Charles J. Boatner
|  | Democratic
| 1888
| Incumbent re-elected.
| nowrap | 

|-
! 
| Samuel Matthews Robertson
|  | Democratic
| 1886
| Incumbent re-elected.
| nowrap | 

|}

Maine 

|-
! 
| Thomas Brackett Reed
|  | Republican
| 1876
| Incumbent re-elected.
| nowrap | 

|-
! 
| Nelson Dingley Jr.
|  | Republican
| 1880
| Incumbent re-elected.
| nowrap | 

|-
! 
| Seth L. Milliken
|  | Republican
| 1882
| Incumbent re-elected.
| nowrap | 

|-
! 
| Charles A. Boutelle
|  | Republican
| 1884
| Incumbent re-elected.
| nowrap | 

|}

Maryland 

One new seat was added in reapportionment. Democrats gained a seat in the new district.

|-
! 
| Henry Page
|  | Democratic
| 1890
|  | Incumbent resigned September 3, 1892.Democratic hold.
| nowrap | 

|-
! 
| Herman Stump
|  | Democratic
| 1888
|  | Incumbent retired.New member elected.Democratic hold.
| nowrap | 

|-
! 
| Harry Welles Rusk
|  | Democratic
| 1886
| Incumbent re-elected.
| nowrap | 

|-
! 
| Isidor Rayner
|  | Democratic
| 1890
| Incumbent re-elected.
| nowrap | 

|-
! 
| Barnes Compton
|  | Democratic
| 1890
| Incumbent re-elected.
| nowrap | 

|-
! 
| William McMahon McKaig
|  | Democratic
| 1890
| Incumbent re-elected.
| nowrap | 

|}

Massachusetts 

|-
! 
| John Crawford Crosby
|  | Democratic
| 1890
|  | Incumbent lost re-election.New member elected.Republican gain.
| nowrap | 

|-
! 
| colspan=3 | None (District created)
|  | New seat.New member elected.Republican gain.
| nowrap | 

|-
! 
| Joseph H. Walker
|  | Republican
| 1888
| Incumbent re-elected.
| nowrap | 

|-
! rowspan=2 | 
| Sherman Hoar
|  | Democratic
| 1890
|  | Incumbent retired to run for Massachusetts Attorney General.Democratic loss.
| rowspan=2 nowrap | 

|-
| Frederick S. Coolidge
|  | Democratic
| 1890
|  | Incumbent lost re-election.New member elected.Republican gain.

|-
! 
| Moses T. Stevens
|  | Democratic
| 1890
| Incumbent re-elected.
| nowrap | 

|-
! 
| William Cogswell
|  | Republican
| 1886
| Incumbent re-elected.
| nowrap | 

|-
! 
| Henry Cabot Lodge
|  | Republican
| 1886
| Incumbent re-elected.
| nowrap | 

|-
! 
| John F. Andrew
|  | Democratic
| 1888
|  | Incumbent lost re-election.New member elected.Republican gain.
| nowrap | 

|-
! 
| Joseph H. O'Neil
|  | Democratic
| 1888
| Incumbent re-elected.
| nowrap | 

|-
! 
| colspan=3 | None (District created)
|  | New seat.New member elected.Independent Democratic gain.
| nowrap | 

|-
! 
| George F. Williams
|  | Democratic
| 1890
|  | Incumbent lost re-election.New member elected.Republican gain.
| nowrap | 

|-
! 
| Elijah A. Morse
|  | Republican
| 1888
| Incumbent re-elected.
| nowrap | 

|-
! 
| Charles S. Randall
|  | Republican
| 1888
| Incumbent re-elected.
| nowrap | 

|}

Michigan 

|-
! 
| John Logan Chipman
|  | Democratic
| 1886
| Incumbent re-elected.
| nowrap | 
|-
! 
| James S. Gorman
|  | Democratic
| 1892
| Incumbent re-elected.
| nowrap | 
|-
! 
| Julius C. Burrows
|  | Republican
| 1884
| Incumbent re-elected.
| nowrap | 
|-
! 
| colspan=3 | None (Incumbent redistricted)
|  | Open seat.New member elected.Republican hold.
| nowrap | 
|-
! 
| Charles E. Belknap
|  | Republican
| 1891
|  | Incumbent lost re-election.New member elected.Democratic gain.
| nowrap | 
|-
! 
| Byron G. Stout
|  | Democratic
| 1890
|  | Incumbent lost re-election.New member elected.Republican gain.
| nowrap | 
|-
! 
| Justin Rice Whiting
|  | Democratic
| 1886
| Incumbent re-elected.
| nowrap | 
|-
! 
| Henry M. Youmans
|  | Democratic
| 1890
|  | Incumbent lost re-election.New member elected.Republican gain.
| nowrap | 
|-
! 
| Harrison H. Wheeler
|  | Democratic
| 1890
|  | Incumbent lost re-election.New member elected.Republican gain.
| nowrap | 
|-
! 
| Thomas A. E. Weadock
|  | Democratic
| 1890
| Incumbent re-elected.
| nowrap | 
|-
! 
| colspan=3 | None (District created)
|  | New seat.New member elected.Republican gain.
| nowrap | 
|-
! 
| Samuel M. Stephenson

|  | Republican
| 1888
| Incumbent re-elected
| nowrap | 

|}

Minnesota 

|-
! 
| William H. Harries
|  | Democratic
| 1890
|  | Incumbent lost re-election.New member elected.Republican gain.
| nowrap | 

|-
! 
| John Lind
|  | Republican
| 1886
|  | Incumbent retired.New member elected.Republican hold.
| nowrap | 

|-
! 
| Osee M. Hall
|  | Democratic
| 1890
| Incumbent re-elected.
| nowrap | 

|-
! 
| James Castle
|  | Democratic
| 1890
|  | Incumbent lost re-election.New member elected.Republican gain.
| nowrap | 

|-
! 
| Kittel Halvorson
|  | People's
| 1890
|  | Incumbent lost renomination.New member elected.Republican gain.
| nowrap | 

|-
! 
| colspan=3 | None (District created)
|  | New seat.New member elected.Democratic gain.
| nowrap | 

|-
! 
| colspan=3 | None (District created)
|  | New seat.New member elected.People's gain.
| nowrap | 

|}

Mississippi 

|-
! 
| John M. Allen
|  | Democratic
| 1884
| Incumbent re-elected.
| nowrap | 

|-
! 
| John C. Kyle
|  | Democratic
| 1890
| Incumbent re-elected.
| nowrap | 

|-
! 
| Thomas C. Catchings
|  | Democratic
| 1884
| Incumbent re-elected.
| nowrap | 

|-
! 
| Clarke Lewis
|  | Democratic
| 1888
|  | Incumbent retired.New member elected.Democratic hold.
| nowrap | 

|-
! 
| Joseph H. Beeman
|  | Democratic
| 1890
|  | Incumbent retired.New member elected.Democratic hold.
| nowrap | 

|-
! 
| T. R. Stockdale
|  | Democratic
| 1886
| Incumbent re-elected.
| nowrap | 

|-
! 
| Charles E. Hooker
|  | Democratic
| 1886
| Incumbent re-elected.
| nowrap | 

|}

Missouri 

|-
! 
| William H. Hatch
|  | Democratic
| 1878
| Incumbent re-elected.
| nowrap | 

|-
! 
| Charles H. Mansur
|  | Democratic
| 1886
|  | Incumbent retired.New member elected.Democratic hold.
| nowrap | 

|-
! 
| Alexander Monroe Dockery
|  | Democratic
| 1882
| Incumbent re-elected.
| nowrap | 

|-
! 
| Robert Patterson Clark Wilson
|  | Democratic
| 1888
|  | Incumbent retired.New member elected.Democratic hold.
| nowrap | 

|-
! 
| John Charles Tarsney
|  | Democratic
| 1888
| Incumbent re-elected.
| nowrap | 

|-
! 
| David A. De Armond
|  | Democratic
| 1890
| Incumbent re-elected.
| nowrap | 

|-
! 
| John T. Heard
|  | Democratic
| 1884
| Incumbent re-elected.
| nowrap | 

|-
! 
| Richard P. Bland
|  | Democratic
| 1884
| Incumbent re-elected.
| nowrap | 

|-
! 
| Richard Henry Norton
|  | Democratic
| 1888
|  | Incumbent lost renomination.New member elected..Democratic hold.
| nowrap | 

|-
! 
| colspan=3 | None (District created)
|  | New seat.New member elected.Republican gain.
| nowrap | 

|-
! 
| John Joseph O'Neill
|  | Democratic
| 1890
|  | Incumbent lost re-election.New member elected..Republican gain.
| nowrap | 

|-
! 
| Seth Wallace Cobb
|  | Democratic
| 1884
| Incumbent re-elected.
| nowrap | 

|-
! rowspan=2 | 
| Robert Washington Fyan
|  | Democratic
| 1890
| Incumbent re-elected.
| rowspan=2 nowrap | 

|-
| Samuel Byrns
|  | Democratic
| 1890
|  | Incumbent lost renomination.New member elected..Democratic loss.

|-
! 
| Marshall Arnold
|  | Democratic
| 1890
| Incumbent re-elected.
| nowrap | 

|-
! 
| colspan=3 | None (District created)
|  | New seat.New member elected.Democratic gain.
| nowrap | 

|}

Montana 

|-
! 
| William W. Dixon
|  | Democratic
| 1890
|  | Incumbent lost re-election.New member elected.Republican gain.
| nowrap | 

|}

Nebraska 

|-
! 
| William Jennings Bryan
|  | Democratic
| 1890
| Incumbent re-elected.
| nowrap | 

|-
! 
| colspan=3 | Vacant
|  | Incumbent redistricted to the .New member elected.Republican gain.
| nowrap | 

|-
! 
| colspan=3 | Vacant
|  | Incumbent redistricted to the .New member elected.Republican gain.
| nowrap | 

|-
! 
| colspan=3 | Vacant
|  | New seat.New member elected.Republican gain.
| nowrap | 

|-
! 
| William A. McKeighan
|  | Populist
| 1890
|  | Incumbent re-elected.Populist gain.
| nowrap | 

|-
! 
| Omer Madison Kem
|  | Populist
| 1890
|  | Incumbent re-elected.Populist gain.
| nowrap | 

|}

New Hampshire 

|-
! 
| Luther F. McKinney
|  | Democratic
| 1890
|  | Incumbent retired.New member elected.Republican gain.
| nowrap | 

|-
! 
| Warren F. Daniell
|  | Democratic
| 1890
|  | Incumbent retired.New member elected.Republican gain.
| nowrap | 

|}

New Jersey 

|-
! 
| Christopher A. Bergen
|  | Republican
| 1888
|  | Incumbent lost renomination.New member elected.Republican hold.
| nowrap | 

|-
! 
| James Buchanan
|  | Republican
| 1884
|  | Incumbent retired.New member elected.Republican hold.
| nowrap | 

|-
! 
| Jacob Augustus Geissenhainer
|  | Democratic
| 1888
| Incumbent re-elected.
| nowrap | 

|-
! 
| Samuel Fowler
|  | Democratic
| 1888
|  | Incumbent retired.New member elected.Democratic hold.
| nowrap | 

|-
! 
| Cornelius A. Cadmus
|  | Democratic
| 1890
| Incumbent re-elected.
| nowrap | 

|-
! 
| Thomas Dunn English
|  | Democratic
| 1890
| Incumbent re-elected.
| nowrap | 

|-
! 
| Edward F. McDonald (Democratic) 
|  | Democratic
| 1890
|  | Incumbent died November 5, 1892Democratic hold.
| nowrap | 

|-
! 
| colspan=3 | None (District created)
|  | New seat.New member elected.Democratic gain.
| nowrap | 

|}

New York 

|-
! 

|}

Nevada 

|-
! 
| Horace F. Bartine
|  | Republican
| 1888
|  | Incumbent retired.New member elected.Silver gain.
| nowrap | 

|}

North Dakota 

|-
! 
| Martin N. Johnson
|  | Republican
| 1890
| Incumbent re-elected.
| nowrap | 

|}

Ohio 

|-
! 
| Bellamy Storer
|  | Republican
| 1890
| Incumbent re-elected.
| nowrap | 

|-
! 
| John A. Caldwell
|  | Republican
| 1888
| Incumbent re-elected.
| nowrap | 

|-
! 
| George W. Houk
|  | Democratic
| 1890
| Incumbent re-elected.
| nowrap | 

|-
! rowspan=2 | 
| Martin K. Gantz
|  | Democratic
| 1890
|  | Incumbent lost renomination.New member elected.Democratic loss.
| rowspan=2 nowrap | 

|-
| Fernando C. Layton
|  | Democratic
| 1890
| Incumbent re-elected.

|-
! 
| Dennis D. Donovan
|  | Democratic
| 1890
| Incumbent re-elected.
| nowrap | 

|-
! 
| John M. Pattison
|  | Democratic
| 1890
|  | Incumbent lost re-election.New member elected.Republican gain.
| nowrap | 

|-
! 
| William E. Haynes
|  | Democratic
| 1888
|  | Incumbent retired.New member elected.Republican gain.
| nowrap | 

|-
! 
| colspan=3 | None (District created)
|  | Republican gain.
| nowrap | 

|-
! 
| colspan=3 | None (District created)
|  | Democratic gain.
| nowrap | 

|-
! rowspan=3 | 
| William H. Enochs
|  | Republican
| 1890
| Incumbent re-elected.
| rowspan=3 nowrap | 

|-
| James I. Dungan
|  | Democratic
| 1890
|  | Incumbent lost re-election.New member elected.Democratic loss.

|-
| Robert E. Doan
|  | Republican
| 1890
|  | Incumbent lost renomination.New member elected.Republican loss.

|-
! 
| colspan=3 | None (District created)
|  | Republican gain.
| nowrap | 

|-
! 
| Joseph H. Outhwaite
|  | Democratic
| 1884
| Incumbent re-elected.
| nowrap | 

|-
! 
| Darius D. Hare
|  | Democratic
| 1890
| Incumbent re-elected.
| nowrap | 

|-
! rowspan=2 | 
| Michael D. Harter
|  | Democratic
| 1890
| Incumbent re-elected.
| rowspan=2 nowrap | 

|-
| James W. Owens
|  | Democratic
| 1888
|  | RetiredDemocratic loss.

|-
! 
| colspan=3 | None (District created)
|  | New seat.New member elected.Republican gain.
| nowrap | 

|-
! 
| Albert J. Pearson
|  | Democratic
| 1890
| Incumbent re-elected.
| nowrap | 

|-
! 
| colspan=3 | None (District created)
|  | New seat.New member elected.Democratic gain.
| nowrap | 

|-
! 
| Joseph D. Taylor
|  | Republican
| 1886
|  | Incumbent retired.New member elected.Democratic gain.
| nowrap | 

|-
! 
| Ezra B. Taylor
|  | Republican
| 1880
|  | Incumbent retired.New member elected.Republican hold.
| nowrap | 

|-
! 
| Vincent A. Taylor
|  | Republican
| 1890
|  | Incumbent retired.New member elected.Republican hold.
| nowrap | 

|-
! 
| Tom L. Johnson
|  | Democratic
| 1890
| Incumbent re-elected.
| nowrap | 

|}

Oregon 

|-
! 
| Binger Hermann
|  | Republican
| 1884
| Incumbent re-elected.
| nowrap | 

|-
! 
| colspan=3 | None (District created)
|  | New seat.New member elected.Republican gain.
| nowrap | 

|}

Pennsylvania 

|-
! 

|}

Rhode Island 

|-
! 
| Oscar Lapham
|  | Democratic
| 1890
| Incumbent re-elected.
| nowrap | 

|-
! 
| Charles H. Page
|  | Democratic
| 1890
| Incumbent re-elected late on a run-off ballot.
| nowrap | ::

|}

South Carolina 

|-
! 
| William H. Brawley
|  | Democratic
| 1890
| Incumbent re-elected.
| nowrap | 

|-
! 
| George D. Tillman
|  | Democratic
| 1882
|  | Incumbent lost renomination.New member elected.Democratic hold.
| nowrap | 

|-
! 
| George Johnstone
|  | Democratic
| 1890
|  | Incumbent retired.New member elected.Democratic hold.
| nowrap | 

|-
! 
| George W. Shell
|  | Democratic
| 1890
| Incumbent re-elected.
| nowrap | 

|-
! 
| John J. Hemphill
|  | Democratic
| 1882
|  | Incumbent lost renomination.New member elected.Democratic hold.
| nowrap | 

|-
! 
| Eli T. Stackhouse
|  | Democratic
| 1890
|  | Incumbent died June 14, 1892Democratic hold.
| nowrap | 

|-
! 
| William Elliott
|  | Democratic
| 1890
|  | Incumbent retired.New member elected.Republican gain.
| nowrap | 

|}

South Dakota 

|-
! rowspan=2 | 
| John Pickler
|  | Republican
| 1889
| Incumbent re-elected.
| rowspan=2 nowrap | 

|-
| John L. Jolley
|  | Republican
| 1891 (special)
|  | Incumbent retired.New member elected.Republican hold.

|}

Tennessee 

|-
! 
| Alfred A. Taylor
|  | Republican
| 1888
| Incumbent re-elected.
| nowrap | 

|-
! 
| John C. Houk
|  | Republican
| 1891 (special)
| Incumbent re-elected.
| nowrap | 

|-
! 
| Henry C. Snodgrass
|  | Democratic
| 1890
| Incumbent re-elected.
| nowrap | 

|-
! 
| Benton McMillin
|  | Democratic
| 1878
| Incumbent re-elected.
|  nowrap | 

|-
! 
| James D. Richardson
|  | Democratic
| 1884
| Incumbent re-elected.
| nowrap | 

|-
! 
| Joseph E. Washington
|  | Democratic
| 1886
| Incumbent re-elected.
| nowrap | 

|-
! 
| Nicholas N. Cox
|  | Democratic
| 1890
| Incumbent re-elected.
| nowrap | 

|-
! 
| Benjamin A. Enloe
|  | Democratic
| 1886
| Incumbent re-elected.
| nowrap | 

|-
! 
| Rice A. Pierce
|  | Democratic
| 1888
|  |Incumbent lost re-election as an Independent Democrat.New member elected.Democratic hold.
| nowrap | 

|-
! 
| Josiah Patterson
|  | Democratic
| 1890
| Incumbent re-elected.
| 

|}

Washington

West Virginia 

|-
! 
| John O. Pendleton
|  | Democratic
| 1890
| Incumbent re-elected.
| nowrap | 

|-
! 
| William Lyne Wilson
|  | Democratic
| 1882
| Incumbent re-elected.
| nowrap | 

|-
! 
| John D. Alderson
|  | Democratic
| 1888
| Incumbent re-elected.
| nowrap | 

|-
! 
| James Capehart
|  | Democratic
| 1890
| Incumbent re-elected.
| nowrap | 

|}

Wisconsin 

Wisconsin elected ten members of congress on Election Day, November 8, 1892.

|-
! 
| Clinton Babbitt
|  | Democratic
| 1890
|  | Incumbent lost re-election.New member elected.Republican gain.
| nowrap | 

|-
! 
| Charles Barwig
|  | Democratic
| 1888
| Incumbent re-elected.
| nowrap | 

|-
! 
| Allen R. Bushnell
|  | Democratic
| 1890
| | Incumbent was redistricted to the 2nd congressional district.New member elected.Republican gain.
| nowrap | 

|-
! 
| John L. Mitchell
|  | Democratic
| 1890
| Incumbent re-elected.
| nowrap | 

|-
! 
| George H. Brickner
|  | Democratic
| 1888
| Incumbent re-elected.
| nowrap | 

|-
! 
| Lucas M. Miller
|  | Democratic
| 1890
| |  Incumbent lost re-nomination.New member elected.Democratic hold.
| nowrap | 

|-
! 
| Frank P. Coburn
|  | Democratic
| 1890
| |  Incumbent lost re-election.New member elected.Republican gain.
| nowrap | 

|-
! 
| Nils P. Haugen
|  | Republican
| 1887
| | Incumbent was redistricted to the 10th congressional district.New member elected.Democratic gain.
| nowrap | 

|-
! 
| Thomas Lynch
|  | Democratic
| 1890
| Incumbent re-elected.
| nowrap | 

|-
! 
| colspan="3" | New district. 
| | New district.New member elected.Republican gain.
| nowrap | 

|}

Wyoming 

|-
! 
| Clarence D. Clark
|  | Republican
| 1890
|  | Incumbent lost re-election.New member elected.Democratic gain.
| nowrap | 

|}

Non-voting delegates

Oklahoma Territory 

|-
! 
| David Archibald Harvey
|  | Republican
| 1890
|  | Incumbent lost re-election.New delegate elected.Republican hold.
| 

|}

See also
 1892 United States elections
 1892 United States presidential election
 1892–93 United States Senate elections
 52nd United States Congress
 53rd United States Congress

Notes

References

Bibliography

External links
 Office of the Historian (Office of Art & Archives, Office of the Clerk, U.S. House of Representatives)